Ernst Majonica (October 29, 1920 – July 21, 1997) was a German politician of the Christian Democratic Union (CDU) and former member of the German Bundestag.

Life 
Majonica joined the CDU and the Junge Union (JU) in 1946. From 1950 to 1955, he was the national chairman of the JU. Majonica was a member of the German Bundestag from 19 November 1950, succeeding Heinrich Lübke, until 1972. He represented the constituency of Arnsberg - Soest in parliament as a member of parliament who was always directly elected. Between 1979 and 1984, he was a member of the first directly elected European Parliament.
Majonica was an outspoken supporter of the german NATOmembership.

Literature

References

1920 births
1997 deaths
Members of the Bundestag for North Rhine-Westphalia
Members of the Bundestag 1969–1972
Members of the Bundestag 1965–1969
Members of the Bundestag 1961–1965
Members of the Bundestag 1957–1961
Members of the Bundestag 1953–1957
Members of the Bundestag 1949–1953
Members of the Bundestag for the Christian Democratic Union of Germany
Christian Democratic Union of Germany MEPs
MEPs for Germany 1979–1984